is a Japanese speed skater. He competed in the 2018 Winter Olympics.

References

External links

1993 births
Living people
Speed skaters at the 2018 Winter Olympics
Japanese male speed skaters
Olympic speed skaters of Japan
Speed skaters at the 2011 Asian Winter Games
Speed skaters at the 2017 Asian Winter Games
Medalists at the 2011 Asian Winter Games
Medalists at the 2017 Asian Winter Games
Asian Games medalists in speed skating
Asian Games gold medalists for Japan
Asian Games silver medalists for Japan